Ain't Nothin' to It is a 2019 studio album by American country music singer Cody Johnson. Released on Warner Music Nashville, the album is Johnson's major label debut and his seventh overall album following six self-released projects.

Content
Johnson signed to Warner Music Nashville in June 2018. The album is his first release for the label, after six independent albums.

As with all of his previous albums, the title track was co-written by David Lee. "On My Way to You" is the lead single. Included are two cover songs: "Long Haired Country Boy", originally by Charlie Daniels, and "Husbands and Wives", which has been recorded by Roger Miller, David Frizzell and Shelly West, and Brooks & Dunn. Trent Willmon is the album's producer.

Critical reception
Giving it 4 out of 5 stars, Stephen Thomas Erlewine of AllMusic stated that "Its blend of classic hardwood honky tonk with a modern sensibility feels assured, the songs are designed to withstand the road, and Johnson feels casually confident in his delivery."

Commercial performance
Ain't Nothin' to It debuted at No. 1 on Billboards Top Country Albums chart with 23,000 copies sold (35,000 in album-equivalent units). The album has sold 63,500 copies in the United States as of March 2020.

Track listing

Personnel
Adapted from AllMusic

Jim "Moose" Brown - piano, Wurlitzer
J.T. Corenflos - electric guitar
Jeneé Fleenor - fiddle
Wes Hightower - background vocals
Cody Johnson - acoustic guitar, lead vocals
Doug Kahan - bass guitar, upright bass
Alison Krauss - fiddle, background vocals
Carl Miner - banjo, acoustic guitar, resonator guitar, mandolin
James Mitchell - electric guitar
Morgan Myles - background vocals
Billy Nobel - Hammond B-3 organ, piano
Justin Ostrander - electric guitar
Brian Pruitt - drums, percussion
Scotty Sanders - dobro, steel guitar, lap steel guitar
Adam Shoenfeld - electric guitar
Jimmie Lee Sloas - bass guitar
Russell Terrell - background vocals
Trent Willmon - electric guitar, background vocals

Charts

Weekly charts

Year-end charts

Certifications

References

2019 albums
Cody Johnson albums
Warner Records albums